Francis Greville may refer to:

Francis Greville, 3rd Baron Brooke (died 1658),
Francis Greville (MP for Warwick) (1667–1710), politician and poet
Francis Greville, 1st Earl of Warwick (1719–1773), British nobleman
Francis Greville, 5th Earl of Warwick (1853–1924), British politician, MP for Somerset East, and for Colchester

See also
Frances Greville (1724–1789), female Irish poet